Stewart's Dam, in Hadley, New York, on the Sacandaga River, holds back the Stewart Bridge Reservoir, one of the largest reservoirs in America to be contained by an earthen dam. Farther upstream is the Conklingville Dam which creates the Great Sacandaga Lake.

Dams in New York (state)
Buildings and structures in Saratoga County, New York